A zigzag is a pattern made up of small corners at variable angles, though constant within the zigzag, tracing a path between two parallel lines; it can be described as both jagged and fairly regular.

In geometry, this pattern is described as a skew apeirogon. From the point of view of symmetry, a regular zigzag can be generated from a simple motif like a line segment by repeated application of a glide reflection.

Although the origin of the word is unclear, its first printed appearances were in French-language books and ephemera of the late 17th century.

Examples of zigzags

The trace of a triangle wave or a sawtooth wave is a zigzag.

Pinking shears are designed to cut cloth or paper with a zigzag edge, to lessen fraying.

In sewing, a zigzag stitch is a machine stitch in a zigzag pattern.

The zigzag arch is an architectural embellishment used in  Islamic, Byzantine, Norman and Romanesque architecture.

In seismology, earthquake recorded in a "zigzag line" form by using seismograph.

See also 
Serpentine shape
Infinite skew polygon

References

Bibliography
 

Patterns